Corsock is a village in the historical county  of Kirkcudbrightshire, Dumfries and Galloway, south-west Scotland.

Corsock House is an 18th-century country house remodelled by David Bryce in 1853. A later addition was made by Charles Stuart Still Johnston in 1910. The gardens are open to the public under the Scotland's Garden Scheme each Spring.

Corsock Church was built as a Free Church in 1851-52 by local architect William McCandlish. It was extended in 1912 by a Gothic stone arch and chancel by J.A McGregor.

Etymology 
Corsock is a Cumbric name formed with the adjectival suffix -awg and either cors 'reeds, rushes, sedge' or crois 'cross'. If formed from cors it may have been an early name for the upper part of the Urr, meaning 'reedy place'. If formed from crois it would mean either 'place with a cross' or 'crossing place'.

References

Villages in Dumfries and Galloway